Nakhchivan Eyalet was possibly an eyalet of the Ottoman Empire. Nakhchivan was recorded as a beylerbeylik in 1603.  In 1591, there were references to a beylerbeylik of Erivan and Nakhchivan, and scholar Donald E. Pitcher speculates that Nakhchivan may have never been a separate eyalet.

References 

Eyalets of the Ottoman Empire in Asia
History of Nakhchivan